The 2020–21 RCD Mallorca season was the club's 87th season in existence and the club's first season back in the second division of Spanish football. In addition to the domestic league, Mallorca participated in this season's edition of the Copa del Rey. The season covered the period from 20 July 2020 to 30 June 2021.

Season overview

August
On 4 August, Mallorca and Espanyol reached an agreement over the finalisation of Vicente Moreno's contract for a sum over €500,000.

On 6 August, the club announced that Luis García Plaza would be the new head coach until June 2022

September
On 9 September, Brian Oliván joined Mallorca on a free transfer after reaching an agreement with Cádiz CF days before.

On 13 September, Mallorca started their season in a 0–1 home defeat to Rayo Vallecano from a second half winner from Isi

On 17 September, Mallorca and Sporting de Braga reached an agreement for the loan of Murilo de Souza to the Spanish side for the rest of the season with an undisclosed option to buy. Mallorca also reached an agreement with forward Yannis Salibur over his contract termination, and later on, announced the transfer of Jordi Mboula from Ligue 1 side AS Monaco.

On 20 September, Mallorca drew 0–0 away against Vicente Moreno's Espanyol.

On 27 September, Mallorca achieved their first win of the season in a 1–0 home victory against CE Sabadell, a late goal from Dani Rodríguez was enough for the Balearic side to claim victory.

On 28 September, Mallorca signed Braian Cufré from Vélez Sarsfield for €1,200,000. Mallorca will own 60% of the player's rights, in the event of achieving promotion, Mallorca must add an extra 20%. Additionally the Balearic club has the option to buy another 10%. The deal was agreed on 24 September, but his arrival was delayed by the lack of flights between Argentina and Spain due to the COVID-19 pandemic. It was also announced that Mallorca had terminated Pablo Chavarría's contract.

October
On 1 October, Mallorca terminated Sergio Moyita's contract.

On 3 October, Mallorca defeated Tenerife 2–0 at home. A goal from Martin Valjent and a penalty kick transformed by Dani Rodríguez helped them to claim victory.

Players

First-team squad

Transfers and loans

Players in

Players Out

Loans Out

Transfer summary
Undisclosed fees are not included in the transfer totals.

Expenditure

Summer:  €1,200,000

Winter:  €0

Total:  €1,200,000

Income

Summer:  €0

Winter:  €0

Total:  €0

Net totals

Summer:  €1,200,000

Winter:  €0

Total:  €1,200,000

Pre-season and friendlies

Competitions

Overview

Segunda División

League table

Results summary

Results by round

Matches
The league fixtures were announced on 31 August 2020.

Copa del Rey

Squad statistics

Appearances
Last updated on 3 October 2020.

Goalscorers

Assists

Clean sheets

Disciplinary record
As of match played 3 October 2020.

Notes

References

External links

RCD Mallorca seasons
Mallorca